Hurricane Grace was a short-lived Category 2 hurricane that contributed to the formation of the powerful 1991 Perfect Storm. Forming on October 26, Grace initially had subtropical origins, meaning it was partially tropical and partially extratropical in nature. It became a tropical cyclone on October 27, and ultimately peaked with winds of 105 mph (165 km/h). The storm had minor effects on the island of Bermuda as it passed to the south. A developing extratropical storm to the north turned Grace eastward; the hurricane was eventually absorbed into the large circulation of the larger low-pressure system. Fed by the contrast between cold air to the northwest and warm air from the remnants of Grace, this storm became a large and powerful Nor'easter that caused extremely high waves and resulted in severe coastal damage along the East Coast of the United States.

Meteorological history

The origins of Grace go back to a mid-level area of low pressure that formed on October 23 to the south of Bermuda. Reports from a nearby ship indicated that the low had become a surface feature by October 25. The storm system initially contained subtropical characteristics, and the center of circulation lacked deep convection for several days. The system was designated a subtropical storm on October 26. An area of clouds near Bermuda became increasingly convective, and gradually became entrained into the expanding and developing circulation of the subtropical storm. Thunderstorm activity persisted near the center, and on October 27, the storm attained tropical storm status and was named Grace.

Grace continued to organize and intensify; based on satellite intensity estimates and reconnaissance reports, the storm was upgraded to a Category 1 hurricane, the lowest level on the Saffir–Simpson hurricane scale. Grace reached its peak intensity with winds of 105 mph (165 km/h) and a minimum central barometric pressure of 980 mbar (hPa; 28.94 inHg), ranking as a Category 2. Operationally, however, the peak intensity was thought to have been 75 mph (120 km/h), which would have made it a mere Category 1 at its peak strength. The hurricane tracked generally northwestward until October 28, when an extratropical cyclone formed along an approaching cold front off the New England coast. This storm rapidly intensified and influenced Grace's steering currents, turning the hurricane sharply east. At around the same time, an eye feature associated with Hurricane Grace became apparent on satellite imagery, despite a lack of strong convective activity around the storm's center. Grace accelerated as it continued eastward, and reached its peak intensity of Category 2 status on October 29. However, the storm's rapid forward movement led to an asymmetrical circulation.

Hurricane Grace turned northeast later that day, as the rapidly approaching extratropical storm undermined the storm's lower-level center. The system became overtaken by the frontal storm, and subsequently lost its status as a tropical system. Afterward, Grace moved north along the front and merged with the large cyclone to the north. The remnants of Grace became completely indistinguishable by the next day, as it was completely absorbed by the passing extratropical storm on October 30. The nor'easter significantly strengthened as a result of the temperature contrast between the cold air to the northwest and the warmth and humidity associated with the remnants of Hurricane Grace. The low-pressure system continued deepening as it drifted southeastward and then southwestward towards the United States. The cyclone attained its peak intensity 390 miles (630 km) south of Halifax, Nova Scotia, as a Category 1 hurricane, with sustained winds of 75 mph (120 km/h). The storm became commonly known as "The Perfect Storm".

Preparations and impact
In advance of Hurricane Grace, a tropical storm warning was issued for Bermuda on October 27. The following day, about 10 hours before the storm's closest approach to the island, the tropical storm warning was upgraded to a hurricane warning. On October 29, the hurricane warning was lowered to a tropical storm warning, which was amended to a gale warning shortly thereafter. The island experienced bands of squally weather in association with the storm. However, no significant damage was reported. A yacht traveling from Bermuda to New York encountered strong winds and  seas well off the Virginia coast; its nine occupants were rescued by Coast Guard helicopters.

Because of its large size, Grace generated large swells along the East Coast of the United States, combined with abnormally high tides; these waves reached at least .

Despite the light impacts from Hurricane Grace, the resultant nor'easter caused extensive coastal damage, high seas, and powerful winds. Hurricane-force wind gusts were reported in New England. The storm churned the ocean for several days; a wave  in height was reported by an offshore buoy. Extensive coastal flooding occurred along the coast of the Mid-Atlantic and Northeastern U.S., with effects as far north as Newfoundland and as far south as Jamaica. The nor'easter eventually transitioned into another hurricane that made landfall in Nova Scotia. A ship known as the Andrea Gail was lost, along with her six crew members, during the storm. The story of the Andrea Gail inspired Sebastian Junger's 1997 book, The Perfect Storm, and a 2000 motion picture film.

See also

 List of Bermuda hurricanes
 List of United States hurricanes
 North Atlantic tropical cyclone

References

External links

 Hurricane Grace Preliminary Report
 List of Bermuda hurricanes

Hurricanes in Bermuda
1991 Atlantic hurricane season
Category 2 Atlantic hurricanes
1991 Perfect Storm